Fox Creek is an unincorporated community in Conejos County, in the U.S. state of Colorado.

History
The first settlement at Fox Creek was made in 1887 by a colony of Mormons. The community takes its name from a nearby creek where foxes were abundant.

References

Unincorporated communities in Conejos County, Colorado